Erica Lynn Green Groenewald (born 25 September 1970) is a mountain bike rider and road cyclist from South Africa. She represented her nation at the 1996 Summer Olympics on the road in the women's road race and on the mountain bike in the women's cross-country and at the 2000 Summer Olympics in the women's cross-country.

References

External links
 profile at sports-reference.com

South African female cyclists
Cyclists at the 1996 Summer Olympics
Cyclists at the 2000 Summer Olympics
Olympic cyclists of South Africa
Living people
Cyclists from Johannesburg
1970 births